Matt Mason (born ) is an American country music singer/songwriter from Fairland, Indiana. He was the winner of CMT's Next Superstar in 2011. Prior to that, he competed on Nashville Star.

Early life and career 
Mason was born in Fairland, Indiana and attended Triton Central High School in Shelby County, Indiana. He grew up listening to traditional country music, and started playing guitar at age eleven, and from that time onward wanted to sing professionally. At age 16, he opened for Charlie Daniels in western Massachusetts. Six months after graduating from high school in 2004, he moved to Nashville, Tennessee to pursue his career, and found work as a session musician. Within three weeks, he was performing in live shows.

Reality Television 
In 2006, at age 20, he appeared on Nashville Star, finishing in fourth place. Afterwards, his productivity was affected by a struggle with alcohol and drug addiction, from which he recovered. He subsequently performed live as often as four times a week in venues on Lower Broadway. In 2011, he won CMT's Next Superstar.

Post-Superstar 
Following his Next Superstar win, Mason was signed to Warner Records. Anticipating a slow process of creating and releasing a major-label album, Mason continued to tour and self-release recordings. He released the EP America's Favorite Pastime in 2012.

Mason lives in Nashville.

Studio albums

References

Further reading

External links
 MattMasonMusic.com

Living people
1980s births
American country singer-songwriters
Musicians from Indianapolis
Nashville Star contestants
21st-century American singers
Country musicians from Indiana
Singer-songwriters from Indiana